The molecular formula C23H34O5 (molar mass: 390.51 g/mol, exact mass: 390.2406 u) may refer to:

 Digoxigenin (DIG)
 Mevastatin, or compactin
 Treprostinil

Molecular formulas